Abbare Yelwa is a ward in Jalingo Local Governemnt Area, the state capital of Taraba, Nigeria.

References 

Local Government Areas in Taraba State